The 2021 South American Trampoline Championships were held in Cochabamba, Bolivia, from December 6 to 13, 2021. The competition was organized by the Bolivian Gymnastics Federation.

Medalists

References

2021 in gymnastics
Trampoline,2021
International gymnastics competitions hosted by Bolivia
2021 in Bolivian sport
December 2021 sports events in South America